Z6 may refer to :
 Z6 small nucleolar RNA
 Motorola ROKR Z6, a cell phone
 SP&S Class Z-6, a steam locomotives class
 a cancelled Chinese helicopter based on the Mil Mi-8
 the IATA code of Dniproavia, an airline of Ukraine
 the Beijing-Nanning-Hanoi Through Train (northbound)
 LNER Class Z6, a class of British steam locomotives 
 Zbrojovka Z6 Hurvínek, a Czechoslovak car of the 1930s
 Nikon Z 6, a Nikon mirrorless camera